Aleksandr Aleksandrovich Martyoshkin (born 29 June 1970) is a Belarusian football coach and a former player. He is a goalkeepers coach for the reserves team of FC Dinamo Minsk.

Honours
Shakhtyor Soligorsk
Belarusian Cup winner: 2003–04

Dinamo Minsk
Belarusian Premier League champion: 2004

External links
 

1970 births
Living people
Soviet footballers
Association football goalkeepers
Belarusian footballers
Belarusian expatriate footballers
Expatriate footballers in Russia
Expatriate footballers in Azerbaijan
Russian Premier League players
FC Shakhtyor Soligorsk players
PFC Krylia Sovetov Samara players
FC Tekstilshchik Kamyshin players
FC KAMAZ Naberezhnye Chelny players
FC Dinamo Minsk players
FC Darida Minsk Raion players
Khazar Lankaran FK players
FC Veras Nesvizh players
FC Klechesk Kletsk players
FC Kristall Smolensk players
FC Bereza-2010 players
Belarusian football managers
FC Torpedo Zhodino managers